Asian Highway 42 (AH42)  is a route of the Asian Highway Network, running  from AH5 in Lanzhou, China to AH1 in Barhi, India.

It passes through the countries of China, Nepal, and India. It is the nearest Asian Highway to Mount Everest.

More than half of the route, from Lhasa to Lanzhou in China, is labelled as a "Potential Asian Highway."

China
It passes through following cities in China
 G6: Lanzhou - Xining - Golmud - Lhasa
 G318: Lhasa - Zhangmu

Nepal
 Araniko Highway: Kodari - Kathmandu
 Tribhuvan Highway: Kathmandu - Narayangarh (AH2) - Pathlaiya (AH2) - Birganj

India

 Raxaul - Motihari - pipra kothi, Mehsi
 Pipra Kothi - Mehsi - Muzaffarpur
 Muzaffarpur
 Muzaffarpur - Barauni
 Barauni - Barh - Bakhtiarpur
 Bakhtiarpur - Bihar Sharif - Nawada - Barhi

References

Asian Highway Network
Highways in Nepal
Highways in India
Roads in China